Johnny Carver may refer to:

 Johnny Carver (musician)
 Johnny Carver (sports author)